This Is a Photograph is the seventh studio album by American indie rock musician Kevin Morby, released on May 13, 2022, on Dead Oceans.

Background and recording

The album was written primarily during Morby's sojourn in Memphis, Tennessee, where he stayed at the historic Peabody Hotel. The album was inspired by Morby's own fear of death and an incident in which his father collapsed before a family dinner in January 2020 after accidentally taking double his heart medication. He began writing the album's title track after viewing old family photos with his mother the night of his father's medical scare, and was particularly struck by an image of his father around his same age posing shirtless on the lawn under the Texas sun. The album also draws inspiration from Memphis' history of tragedy, including Elvis Presley, Jeff Buckley and Jay Reatard, all of whom died in Memphis, and the Lorraine Motel, where Martin Luther King Jr. was assassinated. The album features backing vocals by students of the Stax Music Academy in South Memphis.

This Is a Photograph was produced by Sam Cohen and recorded at his Slow Fawn studio in Accord, New York. Additional recording was done by Wesley Graham at Sam Phillips Recording Studio in Memphis. Rashaan Carter completed additional engineering in New York City. The album was mixed and mastered by D. James Goodwin at the Isokon in Kingston, New York.

Critical reception

This Is a Photograph was met with critical acclaim. At Metacritic, which assigns a normalized rating out of 100 to reviews from professional publications, the album received an average score of 87, based on 10 reviews. Aggregator AnyDecentMusic? gave it 8.1 out of 10, based on their assessment of the critical consensus.

Erin Osmon of Uncut gave the album a 9 out of 10 rating, writing, "With This Is a Photograph, he offers the wisest and most assured rendering of the Middle American vision he's been honing of late, one where Dylan-esque anti-singing narrates impassioned, earnest and earthen tales of family, place, love and heroes, and a crack band shakes the rafters." Fred Thomas of AllMusic wrote that Morby "reveals his fears, joys, and hopes with these songs in a way more direct and on the surface than any of his other albums."

Track listing

Personnel

 Kevin Morby – guitar (2–7, 12), vocals (2–7, 9–12), hand claps (2), melodica (5), samples (5, 6), piano (6), snaps (11)
 Sam Cohen – bass (2–7, 9–11), guitar (2, 3, 9), hand claps (2), piano (4–6), drums (5), organ (5), drum machine (6), snaps (11), lapsteel (12), tambourine (12), production, engineering
 Nick Kinsey – drums (2, 4, 7), hand claps (2), percussion (4)
 Josh Jaeger – percussion (2), drums (3, 9–11), snaps (11)
 Jared Samuel – organ (2, 3), piano (3–11)
 Cochemea Gastelum – saxophone (2, 6, 10), flute (10, 11)
 Alecia Chakour – vocals (2), tambourine (2, 3), backing vocals (5, 7, 11)
 Leah Buckley – backing vocals (2, 6)
 Brenae Johnson – backing vocals (2, 6)
 Briana Johnson – backing vocals (2, 6)
 Zalissa Stewart – backing vocals (2, 6)
 Brittney Walker – backing vocals (2, 6)
 Freddie Cohen – spoken word (2)
 Annie Beedy – spoken word (2)
 Oliver Hill – violin (3, 4, 9–11)
 Meg Hill – violin (3, 4, 9–11)
 Charlotte Hill  – viola (3, 4, 9–11)
 Sam Quiggins – cello (3, 4, 9–11)
 Erin Rae – vocals (4)
 Eric D. Johnson – banjo (4)
 Rachel Baiman – fiddle (4)
 Makaya McCraven – drums (6)
 Brandee Younger – harp (6)
 Cassandra Jenkins – backing vocals (7)
 Tim Heidecker – laughs (7)
 Alia Shawkat – laughs (7)
 Jerry Phillips – spoken word (9)
 Cassandra Jenkins – vocals (11)
 Tufted titmouse – whistle (11)
 Wesley Graham – additional recording
 Rashaan Carter – additional engineering
 D. James Goodwin – mixing, mastering
 Johnny Eastlund – photography
 Mike Krol – design

Charts

References

External links
 Essay by Kevin Morby about This Is a Photograph at Dead Oceans

2022 albums
Kevin Morby albums
Dead Oceans albums